is a horizontally scrolling shooter released for the TurboGrafx-16. It was developed by Zap and published by TSS on February 22, 1991 in Japan and later in 1992 in North America. It was re-released for the Wii Virtual Console in 2007 by Natsume.

Gameplay
Dead Moon features similar gameplay to other horizontally scrolling shoot 'em ups of the era like Gradius and Darius, with enemies attacking the player's ship in sweeping patterns and weapon power-ups that double as one-time shields. The ship can be upgraded with up to three of the same power-up, and any damage will reduce these power-ups by one. Collecting additional power-ups of the same type will reward the player with screen-clearing bombs. Clearing all six levels unlocks a hard mode in which enemies take twice as much damage.

External links
 Dead Moon Review at TurboPlay Magazine Archives

1991 video games
Horizontally scrolling shooters
TurboGrafx-16 games
Virtual Console games
Video games set on the Moon
Single-player video games
TurboGrafx-16-only games
Natsume (company) games
ZAP Corporation games
Science fiction video games